Fana Idrettslag is the biggest multi-sport club in Fana, Bergen, Norway. It has several branches, of which football is the largest. Fana IL was founded on the 3rd of March in 1920 at Stend in Bergen.

The different sports
There are a broad scale of activities within the club, and all the following sports have their own sub-group.:
Alpine skiing
Track and field
Handball
Cross-country skiing / Biathlon
Orienteering
Speed skating
Kickboxing
Bicycle racing
Gymnastics
Rhythmic Gymnastics
Baton Twirling
Football

Football

The men's first team plays in the 3. divisjon, the fourth tier in the Norwegian football league system, after being relegated from the 2. divisjon in 2017. The club had a spell in the second tier 1. divisjon in the 1990s.

Recent history, men's team
{|class="wikitable"
|-bgcolor="#efefef"
! Season
! 
! Pos.
! Pl.
! W
! D
! L
! GS
! GA
! P
!Cup
!Notes
|-
|2001
|2. divisjon, section 2
|align=right |2
|align=right|26||align=right|17||align=right|4||align=right|5
|align=right|66||align=right|36||align=right|55
|Second round
|
|-
|2002
|2. divisjon, section 3
|align=right |5
|align=right|26||align=right|12||align=right|4||align=right|10
|align=right|48||align=right|46||align=right|40
|3rd round
|
|-
|2003
|2. divisjon, section 3
|align=right |11
|align=right|26||align=right|9||align=right|3||align=right|14
|align=right|41||align=right|51||align=right|30
|First round
|
|-
|2004
|2. divisjon, section 3
|align=right |6
|align=right|26||align=right|10||align=right|8||align=right|8
|align=right|48||align=right|57||align=right|38
|Second round
|
|-
|2005
|2. divisjon, section 3
|align=right |10
|align=right|26||align=right|10||3||align=right|13
|align=right|37||align=right|50||align=right|33
|First round
|
|-
|2006
|2. divisjon, section 3
|align=right |8
|align=right|26||align=right|11||align=right|3||align=right|12
|align=right|54||align=right|57||align=right|36
|Second round
|
|-
|2007
||2. divisjon, section 3
|align=right |9
|align=right|26||align=right|9||align=right|8||align=right|9
|align=right|41||align=right|46||align=right|35
|First round
|
|-
|2008
|2. divisjon, section 3
|align=right |11
|align=right|26||align=right|9||align=right|4||align=right|13
|align=right|43||align=right|52||align=right|31
|Second round
|
|-
|2009
|2. divisjon, section 3
|align=right |11
|align=right|26||align=right|8||align=right|4||align=right|14
|align=right|47||align=right|66||align=right|28
|First round
|
|-
|2010
|2. divisjon, section 1
|align=right bgcolor="#FFCCCC"| 14
|align=right|26||align=right|3||align=right|5||align=right|18
|align=right|27||align=right|68||align=right|14
|Second round
|Relegated to 3. divisjon
|-
|2011
|3. divisjon, section 8
|align=right bgcolor=#DDFFDD| 1 
|align=right|26||align=right|18||align=right|5||align=right|3
|align=right|79||align=right|30||align=right|59
|Second round
|Promoted to 2. divisjon
|-
|2012 
|2. divisjon, section 2
|align=right |11 
|align=right|26||align=right|8||align=right|6||align=right|12
|align=right|54||align=right|52||align=right|30
|Second round
|
|-
|2013
|2. divisjon, section 3
|align=right |8 
|align=right|26||align=right|10||align=right|5||align=right|11
|align=right|40||align=right|47||align=right|35
|First round
|
|-
|2014
|2. divisjon, section 3
|align=right |9 
|align=right|26||align=right|9||align=right|6||align=right|11
|align=right|51||align=right|56||align=right|33
|First round
|
|-
|2015
|2. divisjon, section 3
|align=right |10 
|align=right|26||align=right|7||align=right|10||align=right|9
|align=right|42||align=right|57||align=right|31
|Second round
|
|-
|2016
|2. divisjon, section 3
|align=right |5 
|align=right|26||align=right|10||align=right|9||align=right|7
|align=right|35||align=right|29||align=right|39
|Second round
|
|-
|2017
|2. divisjon, section 2
|align=right bgcolor="#FFCCCC"| 13
|align=right|26||align=right|5||align=right|7||align=right|14
|align=right|30||align=right|64||align=right|22
|Second round
|Relegated to 3. divisjon
|-
|2018
|3. divisjon, section 4
|align=right|7
|align=right|26||align=right|13||align=right|1||align=right|12
|align=right|30||align=right|64||align=right|22
|First round
|
|}

References

External links
Fana IL homepage

Sport in Bergen
Football clubs in Norway